North–South Port Link, or Jalan Kem and Jalan Pelabuhan Utara-Barat, Federal Route 180, is an expressway in Klang District, Selangor, Malaysia. It connects Northport Highway (Federal Route 103) in Port Klang to Teluk Gedong near Pandamaran. The Kilometre Zero of the Federal Route 180 starts at Port Klang.

Features

At most sections, the Federal Route 180 was built under the JKR R5 road standard, allowing maximum speed limit of up to 90 km/h.

Port Klang flyover
The Port Klang flyover above Jalan Kem was supposed to make driving between Westport and Northport faster and more convenient, but it has instead become a danger to motorists. The two-kilometre flyover has been stripped of its metal barriers at the side. Should an accident occur, chances are the vehicles involved would fall onto the road below. And there is a high probability of an accident happening, especially at night, as most of the street lights on the flyover are not working. Motorists have expressed concern over the danger posed by the missing barriers and the non-functioning lights as many lorries used the flyover. There is also no emergency lane on the flyover and in the event of a breakdown, an accident could easily happen, especially at night. The Malaysian Public Works Department (JKR) was responsible for maintaining the flyover and the Majlis Perbandaran Klang (Klang Municipal Council) (MPKlg) had written to them asking for repair works to be carried out. But the department replied that there was not enough funds to carry out repairs on the flyover.

Railway crossing bridge 
Construction of a bridge to replace the level crossing and extend the Port Klang flyover started in 2013 and was completed in 2015.

List of interchanges

References

Highways in Malaysia
Malaysian Federal Roads